The S5.80 is a liquid pressure-fed rocket engine burning N2O4/UDMH with an O/F of 1.85. It is used for crew-rated spacecraft propulsion applications. It is currently used in the Soyuz-TMA-M spacecraft propulsion module KTDU-80, and its sibling, the S5.79 rocket engine, is still used as the main propulsion of the Zvezda ISS module.
It is rated for 30 starts with a total firing time of 890 seconds.

Versions
This engine has been used with certain variations in manned Russian space program since the Salyut 6 in Soviet times. The three main versions are:
  11D426: Used as the main orbit correction engine of the Soyuz-T it was part of the integrated propulsion module KTDU-426 which was the big innovation introduced with that series. It enabled using fewer engines, increasing the reliability and reducing the weight of the spacecraft using a dual string redundant pressurization and propellant feed system for the main propulsion and the reaction control system. Since the latter could be used to de-orbit the spacecraft, it eliminated the need for backup orbital correction engine like the KTDU-35 required.
 S5.79 (AKA KRD-79): The orbit correction propulsion module of the second generation DOS stations, the Salyut-6 and Salyut-7 space stations, the Mir Core Module and the Zvezda ISS module. It was designed by KB KhIMMASH under RKK Energia specification based on the 11D426 design. It has improved life and restart capabilities, and is offered in a single compact unit. Each station has two of such engines.
 S5.80: An evolution of the 11D426 and S5.79 it is used on the KTDU-80 propulsion module that has been a staple of all Soyuz since the Soyuz-TM and Progress since the Progress-M. It has slightly reduced thrust but improved specific impulse, while improving engine life over the 11D426.

See also
KB KhIMMASH
KTDU-35
KTDU-80
Soyuz-T
Soyuz-TM

References

External links
 KB KhIMMASH Official Page (in Russian)

Rocket engines of Russia
Rocket engines of the Soviet Union
Rocket engines using hypergolic propellant
Rocket engines using the pressure-fed cycle
KB KhimMash rocket engines